Ichhra (Punjabi) is a commercial and residential area in Lahore, Punjab, Pakistan. It is predominantly a residential and commercial area.

Being a very old locality, some very old buildings can be seen in Ichhra. It is noted for its Ichhra Bazaar, among the most economical markets of Lahore. This market is known for its traditional and cultural dresses and other handicrafts supplied from all over Punjab, as well as its furniture selection. There is a large Christian community living in Ichhra.

There are many healthcare centers and hospitals in Ichhra. Ichhra forms Union Council (UC 100), and is administered as part of Samanabad Tehsil.

In 1930, Inayatullah Khan Mashriqi known as Allama Mashriqi, launched his Khaksars Movement from Icchra (Ichhra) and in 1963, upon his death, Mashriqi was buried here.

References

Bazaars in Lahore
Lahore
Samanabad Zone
Tourist attractions in Lahore